Turritella aurocincta is a species of sea snail, a marine gastropod mollusk in the family Turritellidae. It is located in the Red Sea and around Madagascar.

Description

References

Turritellidae
Gastropods described in 1875